Billy Brown may refer to:

People 
Billy Brown (footballer, born 1900) (1900–1985), English professional footballer
Billy Brown (footballer, born 1910) (1910–1993), footballer who played in the Football League
Billy Brown (footballer, born 1950), Scottish football player and coach
Billy Brown (Irish musician) (1943–1999), Irish musician and artist, and member of The Freshmen
Billy Brown (Australian footballer) (born 1942), former Australian rules footballer who played in the VFL
Billy Brown (actor) (born 1970), American actor
Billy Brown (athlete) (1918–2002), American track and field athlete
Billy Ray Brown (born 1963), former American golfer
Billy Brown (American football) (born 1993), American football tight end
William "Billy" Brown, member of American rhythm and blues band Ray, Goodman & Brown
William Denis Brown III (1931–2012), known as Billy, Louisiana politician
Billy Aaron Brown (born 1981), American actor

Songs 
"Billy Brown", a song from the Mika album Life in Cartoon Motion
"Billy Brown", song from the Third Day album Wire

Characters 
Billy Brown of London Town, character featured on London Transport posters
Billy Brown (Coronation Street)

See also 
Bille Brown (1952–2013), Australian actor
Bill Brown (disambiguation)
William Brown (disambiguation)
Will Brown (disambiguation)
Willie Brown (disambiguation)

Brown, Billy